Enonic XP is a free and open-source web application platform and content management system (CMS) in one based on Java and Elasticsearch. Developed by the Norwegian software company Enonic, the microservice web platform can be used to build progressive web applications, Next.js websites, or web-based APIs. Enonic XP uses an application framework for coding server logic with JavaScript, and has no need for SQL as it ships with an integrated content repository. The CMS is fully decoupled, meaning developers can create traditional websites and landing pages, or use XP in headless mode, that is without the presentation layer, for loading editorial content onto any device or client. Enonic is used by major organizations in Norway, including the national postal service Norway Post, the insurance company Gjensidige, the national lottery Norsk Tipping, the Norwegian Labour and Welfare Administration, and all the top football clubs in the national football league for men, Eliteserien.

Overview 
Enonic XP has embedded web content management, blending applications and websites into one experience. The content management system (CMS) functionality includes a visual drag and drop editor, a landing page editor, support for multi-site and multi-language, media and structured content, advanced image editing, responsive user interface, permissions and roles management, revision and version control, and bulk publishing. Content and website(s) are managed through the "Content Studio," while integrations and applications can be directly installed via the "Applications" section in XP, where the platform finds apps approved in the official Enonic Market.

There are no third-party databases in Enonic XP. Instead the developers have built a distributed storage repository on top of the search engine Elasticsearch, avoiding the need to index content. The system brings together capabilities from Filesystem, NoSQL, document stores, and search in the storage technology, which automatically indexes everything put into the storage.

Enonic XP supports deployment of server side JavaScript and Java applications, using the framework PurpleJS, which includes code build by Enonic. PurpleJS melds Java and JavaScript, and is able to run lightweight JavaScript server applications without the complexity of the Node.js programming model. The open-source framework runs on top of a JVM (Java virtual machine), and allows developers to run the same code in the browser and on the server, thus enabling them to employ JavaScript while working with existing Java projects.

While running on the Java virtual machine, Enonic XP can be deployed on most infrastructures. The dependency on a third-party application server to deploy code has been removed, as the platform is an application server by default. A developer can for instance insert his own modules and code straight into the system while it is running. JavaScript unifies all the technical elements, and Enonic XP features a MVC framework where everything on the back-end can be coded with server-side JavaScript. The Enonic platform can use any template engine. The most used one, Thymeleaf, allows users to create a plain HTML5 document and use it as a view, allowing a designer to work on the HTML file, while a developer can make it more functional and dynamic.

Progressive web apps 
Another feature of Enonic XP is the possibility for developers to create progressive web apps (PWA). A PWA is a web application that is a regular web page or website, but can appear to the user like a mobile application. In early 2017 Enonic released "Office League", an open-source progressive web application built on the Enonic XP platform, making it one of the first companies in Scandinavia to develop and release a production-ready PWA. Later in 2017 Enonic released a PWA starter kit, helping developers build scalable PWAs in Enonic XP.

History 
Enonic AS was founded in 2000 by Morten Øien Eriksen and Thomas Sigdestad. The software company specialized in building services and solutions using Java, including a content management system known as "Vertical Site,", then "Enonic CMS". Being aware that they had application, database, and website teams working on separate silos toward the same goal, Enonic sought to combine the different elements into a single software. The resulting application platform Enonic XP, first released in 2015, includes a CMS as an optional surface layer.

In March 2020, Enonic XP was ranked by SoftwareReviews, a division of Info-Tech Research Group, a Canadian IT research and analyst firm, as the "Leader" in Web Experience Management. The ranking is based on user reviews, and is featured in SoftwareReviews‘ Digital Experience Data Quadrant Report, a comprehensive evaluation and ranking of leading Web Experience Management vendors. Enonic was also ranked first in 2021 and 2022.

Release history 
Enonic XP assumed the mantle from the previous content management system Enonic CMS, and thus began with "version 5.0.0." The following list only contains major releases.

Development and support 
Enonic offers a user and developer community consisting of a forum, support system with tickets, documentation, codex, learning and training center with certifications, and various community groups. Writing about the support system, Mike Johnston of CMS Critic notes that "enterprise customers obviously get access to a higher level of personalized support, where the Enonic support team can respond as fast as two hours." The support system is divided in three levels: silver, gold and platinum—from next day business support to 24/7 support. As Enonic XP is open-source, known vulnerabilities, bugs and issues are listed on GitHub.

See also 

 List of content management systems

References

External links 

 Official website

2015 software
Content management systems
Free content management systems
Software forks
Software using the GPL license
Website management
Free and open-source Android software
Web applications